Zygaena truchmena is a species of moth in the Zygaenidae family. It is found in Central Asia.

According to Seitz - the prettiest and most variegated form, in short one of the finest Burnets, is truchmena Evrsm. (7g). It has a broad rosy- red collar, and the abdomen is bright red, except the apex : the median pair of spots of forewing, however, is white and the basal half of the hindwing transparent: Turkestan.

References

External links
Images representing Zygaena truchmena at Bold

Moths described in 1854
Zygaena
Moths of Asia